The Higsons were an English funk-punk band, who existed between 1980 and 1986.

History
Founded in 1980 at the University of East Anglia in Norwich, Norfolk, England, The Higsons' first recording was on the Norwich - A Fine City compilation album. The Higsons' first single, "I Don't Want to Live with Monkeys", was released in 1981. The band signed to the 2 Tone Records label, along with bands such as The Specials, The Beat and Madness.

The band's blend of high-energy funk and groove brought them some chart success: their most remembered track was "Conspiracy", released in 1982, with the refrain "Who stole my bongos?; Did you steal my bongos?".  The band played their last gig in March 1986, disbanding by mutual consent.

After the break-up
Charlie Higson found fame as a comedy writer and actor in The Fast Show. Dave Cummings, after several years as a guitarist with Scottish rock band Del Amitri, re-joined forces with Higson as a scriptwriter on The Fast Show, and continues to write for radio, TV, and film. Terry Edwards joined Gallon Drunk in 1993, fronted his own band and became a session musician. Simon Charterton formed the bands The Aftershave, Zook, Nitwood and Simon & the Pope. Terry and Simon play together in the Near Jazz Experience. Stuart McGeachin and Colin Williams got full-time jobs.

Robyn Hitchcock paid tribute to the band with the song "Listening to the Higsons" which acknowledged their song "Got to Let This Heat Out" in the couplet, "I thought I heard them singing "Gotta let this hen out"." Hitchcock used this mishearing as the title of his 1985 live album with the Egyptians.

Band members
Charlie "Switch" Higson (lead vocals / harmonica / piano)
Terry Edwards (guitar / saxophone / trumpet / back voices / piano)
Stuart McGeachin (guitar / vocals)
Simon Charterton (drums / vocals)
Colin Williams (bass / vocals)
David Cummings (guitar / vocals)

Discography

Albums
The Curse of the Higsons (October 1984)
Attack of the Cannibal Zombie Businessmen (reissue) (2007)

Cassette
The Higsons Live at the Jacquard Club, Norwich 11.2.82 (limited edition of 4000) (April 1982), Backs Records / Chaos Tapes

Compilation albums
Attack of the Cannibal Zombie Businessmen (retrospective singles compilation) (1987), Waap Records
It's a Wonderful Life (compilation of BBC Radio 1 sessions, on the Hux record label) (1998)

UK singles

BBC Radio 1 in concert
A one-hour concert was recorded and broadcast from the Paris Theatre in London on 7 September 1983. The Higsons played the first half hour whilst the Norwich-based band the Farmer's Boys played the second half.
Tracks played:
"Gangway"
"Where Have All the Club-A-Go-Gos Went Went?"
"Born Blind"
"Music to Watch Boys By"
"Heat"
"Run Me Down"
"Clanking My Bucket"
"Push Out the Boat"

Videos
Jacquard Club, Live February 1982 (released by MEI) NB this is a live audio-cassette only release, not a video.
The Camden Palace, Live 2 November 1984 (broadcast on London Weekend Television programme 'Live In London' 19.1.85)
I Don't Want To Live With Monkeys Live [2006] (released by Cherry Red - reissue of Camden Palace gig)

References

External links
 2-tone artist profile
 Article on The Higsons

English punk rock groups
English funk musical groups
Musical groups established in 1980
Musical groups disestablished in 1986
2 Tone Records artists